Eubranchus falklandicus is a species of sea slug or nudibranch, a marine gastropod mollusc in the family Eubranchidae.

Distribution
This species was described from the Falkland Islands. It has not been reported since the original description.

References

Eubranchidae
Gastropods described in 1907